Pieces of Me may refer to:

 Pieces of Me (Linda Hoyle album), 1971
 Pieces of Me (Ledisi album), 2011
 Pieces of Me (Lori McKenna album), 2001
 Pieces of Me, a 2018 album by Tiffany

 "Pieces of Me" (song), a 2004 song by Ashlee Simpson
 "Pieces of Me", a song by Meat Puppets from the album Golden Lies, 2000
 "Pieces of Me", a song by 3 Doors Down from the album Us and the Night, 2016

See also
 Piece of Me (disambiguation)